Härjanurme may refer to several places in Estonia:

Härjanurme, Jõgeva County, village in Puurmani Parish, Jõgeva County
Härjanurme, Tartu County, village in Puhja Parish, Tartu County